Xinshi 1st Rd is a light rail station of the Danhai light rail, which is operated by New Taipei Metro. It is located in Tamsui District, New Taipei, Taiwan.

Station overview
The station is an elevated station with two side platforms. It is located above Provincial Highway 2 near its intersection with Xinshi 1st Road Section 3.

Station layout

References

2018 establishments in Taiwan
Railway stations opened in 2018
Danhai light rail stations